The 1977 Fresno State Bulldogs football team represented California State University, Fresno as a member of the Pacific Coast Athletic Association (PCAA) during the 1977 NCAA Division I football season. Led by second-year head coach Jim Sweeney, Fresno State compiled an overall record of 9–2 with a mark of 4–0 in conference play, winning the PCAA title. The Bulldogs played their home games at Ratcliffe Stadium on the campus of Fresno City College in Fresno, California.

Schedule

Team players in the NFL
The following were selected in the 1978 NFL Draft.

References

Fresno State
Big West Conference football champion seasons
Fresno State Bulldogs football seasons
Fresno State Bulldogs football